Nazca is a city in Peru.

Nazca, NAZCA or Nasca may also refer to:

Places
 Nazca Desert, an alternate name for the Sechura Desert in western South America
 Nazca District, a district in the Nazca province, Peru
 Nazca Plate, a tectonic plate in the west of South America
 Nasca Province, a province in the Ica Region, Peru
 Nazca Ridge, an ocean ridge in the southern Pacific Ocean
 Nazca (crater) on the planet Mars
 Los Nascas, Comatrana, Ica, Peru; a barrio
 Nazcas River, a river in Durango, Mexico

Nazca civilization
 Nazca culture, a pre-Columbian culture of the Nazca region
 Nazca Lines, the UNESCO world heritage site Lines and Geoglyphs of Nasca and Pampas de Jumana

Biology
 Nazca (moth), a genus of geometer moths
 Nazca booby a seabird.

Entertainment
 Nazca (anime), a 1998  anime television series
 Nazca, a character in Keroro Gunso the Super Movie 3
 A Gaia Memory in the tokusatsu show Kamen Rider W

Transportation
 Nazca (Buenos Aires Metro)
 Nazca airport, Ica Region, Peru
 BMW Nazca C2, a 1991 Italdesign made concept car

Organizations
 NASCA International, a national organisation of swinging clubs.
 Nazca Corporation, a producer of video games for the Neo-Geo system, formed from Irem departees
NAZCA, the Non-state Actor Zone for Climate Action, a web portal providing information about climate action around the world

Other uses
 Sergio Nasca (1937-1989) Italian film director

See also

 1996 Nazca earthquake
 Paracas (disambiguation), including the pre-Nazca